The 2012 FIA Formula Two Championship was the fourth and the last of the FIA Formula Two Championship. The season started on 14 April at Silverstone and finished on 30 September at Monza. The 2012 calendar saw the addition of two new races.

In the opening round at Silverstone, the first pole of the season was claimed by Mathéo Tuscher, the youngest driver to have taken part in the series. Tuscher was overtaken by Christopher Zanella on the first lap of the opening race; Zanella was later joined by Mihai Marinescu and Luciano Bacheta out front, with Bacheta eventually prevailing over Zanella with series debutant Alex Fontana in third. Marinescu claimed pole position for the second race, but could not stop Bacheta taking his second win of the weekend; Fontana again completed the podium, behind Marinescu.

Drivers

Driver changes
 Entering/Re–Entering FIA Formula Two Championship
 Samuele Buttarelli switched from Auto GP to the championship.
 Formula Renault ALPS driver Mauro Calamia graduated into Formula Two in 2012.
 European F3 Open champion Alex Fontana graduated to the series.
 After competing in the first three rounds of the Auto GP World Series, Victor Guerin joined the series ahead of the Portimão round.
 Daniel McKenzie moved into the series from the Formula Renault 3.5 Series.
 After competing in the GP2 Series in 2011, Kevin Mirocha switched to the FIA Formula Two Championship.
 After finishing seventh in the German Formula Three Championship, Markus Pommer graduated into Formula Two in 2012.
 Formula Pilota China champion Mathéo Tuscher and eighth-placed David Zhu moved into the championship.
 Formula Renault BARC champion Dino Zamparelli as well as fourth-placed Kourosh Khani and thirteenth-placed Hector Hurst all joined the championship.

 Leaving FIA Formula Two Championship
 Alex Brundle joined Carlin in the GP3 Series.
 Jack Clarke and Benjamin Lariche switched to sportscar racing, joining the European Le Mans Series and FIA GT1 World Championship respectively.
 Armaan Ebrahim moved to the United States to compete in Firestone Indy Lights.
 Jordan King switched to the Formula Renault Eurocup with Manor MP Motorsport.
 Jon Lancaster graduated to the GP2 Series with Ocean Racing Technology.

Race calendar and results
An eight-race calendar was published by the FIA World Motor Sport Council on 7 December 2011.

Calendar changes
 As in 2011, the series will take place over sixteen races at eight rounds, but the overall length of the calendar has been shortened from seven months to six.
 Two new rounds are to be introduced for the 2012 season, with races due to take place at Circuit Paul Ricard and the Hungaroring.
 After being removed from the 2011 calendar, the series will return to the Autódromo Internacional do Algarve in Portugal.
 The races at the Red Bull Ring, Circuit de Nevers Magny-Cours and Circuit de Catalunya will be discontinued to make way for new and returning races.

Championship standings

 Spa Race 2 ran only four laps, and the race was red-flagged because of rain and crashes on Lap 3 that resulted in a caution.  The race was subsequently red-flagged, and under the count-back rule in red flag situations, the race lasted only three laps for a total time of 9:38.007, much less than the 30 minutes required in the 40-minute race, so only half points are awarded as the race did not reach the 75% required for full points.

References

External links
 The official website of the FIA Formula Two Championship

FIA Formula Two Championship seasons
Formula Two season
Formula Two season
Formula Two